George Alfred Spencer (1873 – 21 November 1957) was an English miner, trade union leader and Member of Parliament from 1918 to 1929 for Broxtowe.

Family
George Spencer was the second son of eighteen children. His youngest daughter was the wife of the director of the NSPCC in the 1930s.

Trade unionism
Spencer was an official of the Nottinghamshire Miners Association, which was affiliated to the Miners Federation of Great Britain. In 1926, at the height of the General Strike, he negotiated on the behalf of the Nottinghamshire Miners Association a deal with the local mine owners at the request of miners from Digby Pit, near Eastwood, in Nottinghamshire. However, that brought him into conflict with the MFGB, which wished to see the strike continue. Unhappy with the influence of the MFGB, he led a breakaway from the NMA and set up the Nottinghamshire and District Miners' Industrial Union (NMIU) based mostly in The Dukeries, which lasted for eleven years separate from the Miners' Federation of Great Britain. In 1937, a merger agreement was reached between the NMA and the NMIU, with Spencer becoming the president of the new organisation.

Political career
During the Great War he combined with fellow Nottinghamshire Miners official and Liberal MP John Hancock to attempt to take the Nottinghamshire Miners Association out of the Miners Federation of Great Britain political fund, as he believed in trade union independence from party political control. He was elected to parliament in 1918 as Labour MP for Broxtowe, and re-elected at the next three general elections. Following the Nottinghamshire miners union split of 1926, he was expelled from the Labour party. He continued to sit in parliament until 1929, speaking from the Liberal party benches. The Broxtowe Labour party, instead of replacing him with another local miners candidate, chose Seymour Cocks, an outsider with no mining background.

References

External links 
 

Labour Party (UK) MPs for English constituencies
UK MPs 1918–1922
UK MPs 1922–1923
UK MPs 1923–1924
UK MPs 1924–1929
Miners' labor disputes
Miners' Federation of Great Britain-sponsored MPs
1872 births
1957 deaths
People from Stapleford, Nottinghamshire
Members of Nottinghamshire County Council
English trade unionists